Chuni Lal Bhagat is an Indian politician and was Minister for Forest and wildlife, labour in the Punjab Government. He is member of Bharatiya Janta Party (BJP).

Early life
He was born in Sialkot, British India on 1 December 1932. His father's name is Mehnga Ram and mother's name Rukmani Devi. He  studied up to Matriculation.

Business
He has a business of exporting sports goods.

Political career
He contended election from Jullundur (Jalandhar) South in 1985 as an Independent candidate, but lost the elections. In 1997, he again contested from Jalandhar South as BJP candidate and became a member of Punjab Vidhan Sabha. He again won from Jalandhar South in 2007 In 2012, Jalandhar South underwent  Boundary delimitation and he successfully contested from new constituency Jalandhar West. He was elected Deputy Speaker of Punjab assembly in 2011 after the resignation of Satpal Gosain. He was cabinet minister and hold portfolio of Local Government and Medical Education & Research. He was the leader of BJP legislative party in assembly from 2012 to 2017. He didn't contest election in 2017.

Personal life
He was married to Late Sheela Devi. He has four sons and four daughters.

References

State cabinet ministers of Punjab, India
Living people
Punjab, India MLAs 1997–2002
Punjab, India MLAs 2007–2012
Punjab, India MLAs 2012–2017
Bharatiya Janata Party politicians from Punjab
Members of the Punjab Legislative Assembly
People from Jalandhar
1932 births
Politicians from Sialkot
Deputy Speakers of the Punjab Legislative Assembly